The common smooth-hound (Mustelus mustelus) is a houndshark of the family Triakidae. It is found in the eastern Atlantic Ocean from the British Isles to South Africa, and in the Mediterranean Sea, Madeira, and the Canary Islands at depths ranging from 5 to 625 m (although they usually stay at depths of 5-50m). While they can grow to 200 cm, their usual maximum size is 150 cm. They commonly grow to 100–120 cm with a birth length around 35 cm.
The reproduction of commons smooth-hounds is viviparous.

Morphology and behavior
The common smooth-hound has a grey-brown back and is white on its underneath. It is often confused with the starry smooth-hound, which has white spots on its back. The starry smooth-hound can often have faded spots that leads to misidentification. Another shark with which it is often confused is the tope shark, although the common smooth-hound has a larger second dorsal fin. 
The common smooth-hound has two dorsal fins, an anal fin, a pair of pectoral fins, a pair of pelvic fins, and a heterocercal tail. All of these fins help stabilise the shark, but in males, the pelvic fins are modified to form claspers.

Like other smooth-hound sharks, the common smooth-hound aggregates in large numbers, like a pack of dogs, so they are called hounds.

References

 
 
 Smooth Hound (MUSTELUS MUSTELUS) - European Federation of Sea Angling Records

External links
 
 

common smooth-hound
Marine fish of Europe
Fish of the Mediterranean Sea
Marine fauna of North Africa
common smooth-hound
Taxa named by Carl Linnaeus